Jordan Springs is a suburb of Sydney, in the state of New South Wales, Australia. It was registered with the Geographical Names Board of New South Wales in 2011.

On 22 November 2019, the suburb was expanded eastwards up to South Creek, incorporating the Central Precinct of the St Marys Release Area, which was previously part of the suburb of Llandilo.

References

Suburbs of Sydney
Populated places in New South Wales
City of Penrith